The Five Nations, a collection of poems by English writer and poet Rudyard Kipling (1865–1936), was first published in late 1903, both in the United Kingdom  and the U.S.A.
Some of the poems were new; some had been published before (notably "Recessional"" in 1897), sometimes in different versions.

Description
In 1903, the United Kingdom consisted of four nations: England, Ireland, Scotland and Wales. It was soon suggested that Kipling's "five nations" were the "five free nations of Canada, Australia, New Zealand, South Africa [i.e. Cape Colony], and 'the islands of the sea' [i.e. the British Isles]" —all dominated by Britons; and except in the last case, by recent settlers. That suggestion was endorsed some one hundred years later.

In an early (1903) review, American critic Bliss Perry delicately called The Five Nations both "a notable collection" and "singularly restricted in range of interest".

The poems

The poems are divided into two groups. The first is untitled, and covers a wide range of subjects. The second is titled "Service Songs", and mostly relates to the real or imagined experiences of common British soldiers around the turn of the 20th century.

The untitled group

 "Dedication"
 "The Sea and the Hills"
 "The Bell Buoy"
 "Cruisers"
 "The Destroyers"
 "White Horses"
 "The Second Voyage"
 "The Dykes"
 "The Song of Diego Valdez"
 "The Broken Men"
 "The Feet of the Young Men"
 "The Truce of the Bear"
 "The Old Men"
 "The Explorer"
 "The Wage-Slaves"
 "The Burial"
 "General Joubert"
 "The Palace"
 "Sussex"
 "Song of the Wise Children"
 "Buddha at Kamakura"
 "The White Man's Burden"
 "Pharaoh and the Sergeant"
 "Our Lady of the Snows"
 "'Et Dona Ferentes'"
 "Kitchener's School"
 "The Young Queen"
 "Rimmon"
 "The Old Issue"
 "Bridge-Guard in the Karroo"
 "The Lesson"
 "The Files"
 "The Reformers"
 "Dirge of Dead Sisters"
 "The Islanders"
 "The Peace of Dives"
 "South Africa"
 "The Settler"

Service Songs

 "Chant-Pagan"
 "M.I."
 "Columns"
 "The Parting of the Columns"
 "Two Kopjes"
 "The Instructor"
 "Boots"
 "The Married Man"
 "Lichtenberg"
 "Stellenbosh"
 "Half-Ballad of Waterval"
 "Piet"
 "'Wilful-Missing'"
 "Ubique"
 "The Return"
 "Recessional"

Notes

References

External links

 

1903 poetry books
Poetry by Rudyard Kipling
English poetry collections